Tholstrup is a Danish surname. Notable people with the surname include:

Hans Tholstrup (1901–1946), Danish sailor
Hans Tholstrup (born 1944), Australian adventurer 
Ole Tholstrup (1930–1990), Danish industrialist
 Kristina "Kiki" Tholstrup, wife of Roger Moore

Danish-language surnames